Eliyahu Hanavi Synagogue is a synagogue in Alexandria, Egypt built in the Neo-Gothic style. It is located in Nabi Daniel street. An earlier synagogue was built on the site in 1354, but was bombed and destroyed by the French during their invasion of Egypt in 1798.  A new synagogue, the current building, began construction in 1850 with contributions from the Muhammad Ali Dynasty. It is included on the World Monuments Fund's 2018 list of monuments at risk.

Although services are still held in the synagogue, it now caters to a very small community due to the dwindling number of Jews in Alexandria. The synagogue was closed for the 5773 (2012) High Holidays because of security reasons.

In 2017, the Egyptian government announced a project to restore the synagogue in a growing move of keeping its Jewish heritage alive. It was rededicated in January 2020, with three Jews present at the ceremony.

See also
History of the Jews in Egypt
History of the Jews in Alexandria
List of synagogues in Egypt

References

1850 establishments in Egypt
Buildings and structures completed in 1354
Elijah
Orthodox Judaism in Egypt
Orthodox synagogues
Synagogues completed in 1850
Religious organizations established in 1850
Sephardi Jewish culture in Egypt
Sephardi synagogues
Synagogues in Alexandria
19th-century religious buildings and structures in Egypt